The Men's -60 kg competition at the 2010 World Judo Championships was held at 12 September at the Yoyogi National Gymnasium in Tokyo, Japan. 72 competitors contested for the medals, being split in 4 Pools where the winner advanced to the medal round.

Pool A
Last 32 fights:
 Ali Khousrof 100 vs.  Edil Bekkulov 000
 Elio Verde 100 vs.  Lusanda Ngoma 000
 Prashuram Tharu 000 vs.  Juan Postigos 100

Pool B
Last 32 fights:
 Navjot Chana 100 vs.  Lavrentios Alexanidis 000
 Jeroen Mooren 010 vs.  Aaron Kunihiro 000

Pool C
Last 32 fights:
 James Millar 000 vs.  Pavel Petříkov 110
 Fredy Lopez 000 vs.  Sofiane Milous 101

Pool D
Last 32 fight:
 Georgii Zantaraia 110 vs.  Choi Min-Ho 011

Repechage

Finals

References

 Results

External links
 
 Official Site 

M60
World Judo Championships Men's Extra Lightweight